The Master Piano Technicians of America (MPT) is an international organization of piano technicians, and is one of two such major organizations in the United States (the other being the Piano Technicians Guild, or PTG).  MPT was founded in 1976 in Cherry Hill, New Jersey by five members of the PTG.  MPT is currently headquartered in Philadelphia, Pennsylvania.

Objectives 

The primary objectives of MPT are to advance the well-being of its members, and to advance high standards of technical proficiency in the piano service field.

Membership and statistics 

MPT was originally seen by its founders as an alternative to the Piano Technicians Guild. However, many technicians maintain dual memberships in both organizations.  Though not as large or well known as the PTG, MPT is now represented in six nations and thirty-eight states. MPT has only one class of membership, that of "Master Piano Technician." Decisions regarding membership standards and requirements are left to individual chapters.

Education and convention 

MPT educates its members through a journal (published quarterly) and an annual convention-institute. Through the journal and convention-institute, technicians can learn new techniques and discuss trends in the piano service field. Recently, MPT started awarding two convention-institute scholarships to outstanding students of the Randy Potter School (of Piano Technology). The recipients can attend the convention and technical classes, thus building their piano service skills.

References

External links 
 Official website

Cherry Hill, New Jersey
Musical tuning
Music organizations based in the United States
Professional associations based in the United States
Organizations established in 1976
Organizations based in Philadelphia
1976 establishments in New Jersey